Kharabeh-ye Qaderlu (also Romanized as Kharābeh-ye Qāderlū; also known as Kharābeh-ye Qadīrlū) is a village in Arshaq-e Shomali Rural District, Arshaq District, Meshgin Shahr County, Ardabil Province, Iran. At the 2006 census, its population was 16, in 5 families.

References 

Towns and villages in Meshgin Shahr County